The Santa Maria de Vison was a Mediterranean merchantman built in Ragusa and requisitioned in 1587 for service in the Armada of 1588. She was a large carrack and displaced 666 tons and carried 18 guns.

Armada service

She was part of the Levant squadron, a unit made up of mainly heavy transports carrying equipment and soldiers for the land invasion of England. Only one of the Levant squadron made it back to Spain. During the voyage half the fleets medical supplies were transferred to this ship after the La Paz became unseaworthy.

Wreck

She was wrecked during a storm on 22 September 1588 of the coast of Cairbre Drom Cliabh (now county Sligo) on a sandbank off Streedagh strand. Her wreck was discovered in 1985 by an English salvage team. The wreck is protected under the National Monuments (Amendment) Acts 1987 and 1994.

References

Spanish Armada
16th-century maritime incidents
16th-century ships